Aspergillus insolitus is a species of fungus in the genus Aspergillus. It is from the Polypaecilum section. The species was first described in 2014. The genome of A. insolitus was in 2016 sequenced as a part of the Aspergillus whole-genome sequencing project - a project dedicated to performing whole-genome sequencing of all members of the genus Aspergillus. The genome assembly size was 23.18 Mbp.

Growth and morphology

A. insolitus has been cultivated on both Czapek yeast extract agar (CYA) plates and Malt Extract Agar Oxoid® (MEAOX) plates. The growth morphology of the colonies can be seen in the pictures below.

References 

insolitus
Fungi described in 2014